The 1918–19 Wisconsin Badgers men's basketball team represented University of Wisconsin–Madison. The head coach was Guy Lowman, coaching his second season with the Badgers. The team played their home games at the Red Gym in Madison, Wisconsin and was a member of the Big Ten Conference.

Schedule

|-
!colspan=12| Regular Season

References

Wisconsin Badgers men's basketball seasons
Wisconsin
Wisconsin Badger
Wisconsin Badger